|}

The Challenge Stakes is a Group 3 flat horse race in Ireland open to fillies and mares aged three years or older. It is run at Leopardstown over a distance of 1 mile and 6 furlongs (2,816 metres), and it is scheduled to take place each year in July.

The race was first run in 1991 and was restricted to fillies and mares from 2016.  Since 2016 the race has been run as the Stanerra Stakes. In 2018 it was upgraded from Listed to Group 3 status as part of changes to enhance the European programme of stayer's races.

Records
Most successful horse (3 wins):
Profound Beauty – 2008, 2009, 2010

Leading jockey (8 wins):
Pat Smullen – Vinnie Roe (2001), Orpington (2005), Profound Beauty (2008, 2009, 2010), Sense Of Purpose (2011), Galileo's Choice (2012), Pale Mimosa (2014)

Leading trainer (8 wins):
 Dermot Weld – Vinnie Roe (2001), Orpington (2005), Profound Beauty (2008, 2009, 2010), Sense Of Purpose (2011), Galileo's Choice (2012), Pale Mimosa (2014)

Winners

See also
 Horse racing in Ireland
 List of Irish flat horse races

References

 Racing Post:
 , 

 ifhaonline.org – International Federation of Horseracing Authorities – Stannera Stakes (2019).

Flat races in Ireland
Leopardstown Racecourse
Open long distance horse races
Recurring sporting events established in 1991
1991 establishments in Ireland